Latrodectus erythromelas, is a species of venomous spider of the genus Latrodectus, commonly called widow spiders. It is native to India and Sri Lanka.

Description
Female is larger than male, and the average total length is about 8.8mm. Eyes are black, where eye region dark with blackish-red margins. The blackish carapace is much rounded and covered with fine hairs. The cephalothorax is also black and also covered with fine hair. On the dorsal surface of the cephalothorax, there is a prominent red stripe.

See also
 List of Theridiidae species

References

erythromelas
Spiders of the Indian subcontinent
Spiders of Asia
Spiders described in 1991